The Payoff   is an Italian crime comedy film directed in 1978 by Sergio Corbucci. It is based on the 1976 crime novel of the same name by the writer Attilio Veraldi.

Cast 
 Nino Manfredi: Sasà Jovine
 Ugo Tognazzi: Commissioner Assenza
 Paolo Stoppa: Don Michele Miletti
 Marisa Laurito: Luisella
 Imma Piro: Giulia Miletti
 Gennaro Di Napoli: Nicola Casali
 Marisa Merlini: Elena, Michele's first wife
 Sal Borgese: Tonino
 Giovanni Borgese: Pasquale
 Benito Stefanelli: Improta
 Giacomo Furia: Antonio
 Nino Vingelli: Catelli
 Lilly Furia: Miss Catelli
 Pietro De Vico: Car parking-Caretaker

Sequel
Following the commercial success of the movie it was planned a movie-adaptation from the Veraldi's second novel based on the character of Sasà Jovine, L'uomo di conseguenza (1978), still directed by Sergio Corbucci and starred by Marcello Mastroianni in the role of Jovine. After a series of meetings Mastroianni declined: he was not enthusiast to resume a character already successfully performed by Nino Manfredi and the plot of the sequel involved incest, a scabrous subject he had treated the same year in the movie Stay As You Are. The production then decided to make him play a story with a tone more similar to La mazzetta but not based on any novel, Neapolitan Mystery.

References

Further reading
Attilio Veraldi. La mazzetta. Rizzoli, 1976.

External links

1978 films
Films based on Italian novels
Films directed by Sergio Corbucci
Commedia all'italiana
Films set in Naples
Films about the Camorra
Italian crime comedy films
1970s crime comedy films
1970s Italian-language films
1970s Italian films